Baleskeleh-ye Seyyed Abu ol Qasem (also Romanized as Baleskeleh-ye Seyyed Ābū ol Qāsem; also known as Balaskaleh and Baleskeleh) is a village in Nowsher-e Koshk-e Bijar Rural District, Khoshk-e Bijar District, Rasht County, Gilan Province, Iran. At the 2006 census, its population was 110, in 34 families.

References 

Populated places in Rasht County